The Vine Street Bridge in West Union, Iowa brings South Vine St. over Otter Creek.  It is a concrete Luten arch bridge built in 1910 by N.M. Stark & Co.  It was listed on the National Register of Historic Places in 1998.

The NRHP nomination for the bridge asserts that "with its 66-foot span, the Vine Street Bridge is distinguished
as one of the longest-span Luten arches remaining in Iowa."

See also
Minerva Creek Bridge

References

Road bridges on the National Register of Historic Places in Iowa
Bridges completed in 1910
West Union, Iowa
Bridges in Fayette County, Iowa
National Register of Historic Places in Fayette County, Iowa
Concrete bridges in the United States